Denis Conway (born 21 September 1960) is an Irish actor. He has had roles in the films Michael Collins (1996), Alexander (2004) and later as Brendan Close in Aisha (2022). Conway was the artistic director of Ouroboros Theatre Company for 10 years. He is also a member of the board of the Brian Friel Trust.  As an Irish speaker, Conway has presented documentaries for TG4 such as Hollywood in Eireann

Awards
In 2008, at the 5th Irish Film & Television Awards, he was nominated for the Best Actor in Lead Role in Television for his work on the Running Mate.

In 2010, he won an Irish Theatre Award, in the "best actor" category, for his portrayal of the titular role in the Ouroboros Theatre Company's production of Shakespeare's Richard III. In 2013, he was nominated in the "best supporting actor" category for his portrayal of "Mitch" in the play A Streetcar Named Desire. He won the "best actor" award for the second time, in 2015, for his portrayal of "Irish Man" in Gate Theatre's production of Tom Murphy's The Gigli Concert.

Filmography

Stage

Film

Television

References

1960 births
Living people
Male actors from Cork (city)
Irish artistic directors
Irish male film actors
Irish male stage actors
Irish male television actors
20th-century Irish actors
21st-century Irish actors
Fair City characters
Irish male soap opera actors